DuShon Monique Brown (November 30, 1968 – March 23, 2018) was an American actress known for her performances as Nurse Katie Welch on the Fox series Prison Break and Connie in the NBC series Chicago Fire  from 2012 until her death in 2018.

Early life and education
Brown was born in Chicago on November 30, 1968, to Zachary M. Brown and Liz Colburn. She was a graduate of Whitney M. Young Magnet High School and Governors State University, with a master's degree in school counseling. Brown previously worked at Chicago's South Shore International College Preparatory High School as the guidance counselor, and at Kenwood Academy High School as a crisis counselor and drama instructor.

Career

Early career
Brown was active in theater in her hometown for many years. Her first performance on television was 2003's made-for-TV movie Skin Complex. From 2005 to 2007, she was on Prison Break. Brown appeared in 2011's The Dilemma in an uncredited role. Brown was in 2012's romantic comedy One Small Hitch.

Chicago Fire
In 2012, Brown began playing the recurring role of Connie on Chicago Fire. Of her time on the TV show, Brown said in an interview with Hidden Remote, "She was a secretary and had a single speech. But I auditioned because it was a new series in Chicago Fire and had the possibility that she could become. She sees herself, especially with the younger members of the team, as a kind of mother, aunt, teacher. Eamonn and I, we play when I'm on the set that Connie is the boss's working wife and all the rest are her kids, they wrote Connie as that motherly figure that everyone seems to run away from. I'm just a goofy, geeky Chicagoan who plays the violin, likes karaoke, embraces the trees, loves to be appreciated for her work and dreams of playing a superhero in the movies." She was asked how she would feel about a spinoff called Chicago Ed or Chicago Shelter by reporter Andrew Crist, who noted Brown's master's degree in counseling and background in social work; Brown replied, "I’m there! If they pull that show out, I will be an actor and a consultant! Trust me."

Later career
Brown  guest-starred in Boss in 2012 and Shameless in 2013. She was in 2015's Unexpected. Brown was also in 2015's A Light Beneath Their Feet. In 2015, she guest-starred on Empire. Brown guest-starred on Electric Dreams in 2017. Also in 2017, she was in the comedy film Surprise Me! written and directed by Nancy Goodman and based on the book of the same name by Goodman. Her last role was in 2017's made-for-TV movie Public Housing Unit.

Personal life and death
Brown had one child: a daughter, Zoe. She had one brother and two sisters: Zachary Brown Jr., Zaire King, and Jamyra Siek. Brown checked herself into the hospital earlier in the week of her death, after experiencing chest pains, but was released after undergoing tests. She died at St. James Olympia Fields Hospital on March 23, 2018. The Cook County coroner scheduled an autopsy on March 24, 2018. On May 31, 2018, the Cook County Medical examiner confirmed the death was the result of sepsis of an unknown etiology. Obesity and high blood pressure were also cited as the reason of sudden death.

Filmography

Film

Television

Theatre

References

External links

1968 births
2018 deaths
Actresses from Chicago
American television actresses
Governors State University alumni
21st-century American actresses